This is a list of mayors of Frederiksberg Municipality, Denmark since the first mayor was elected in 1919. All mayors of Frederiksberg have represented the Conservative People's Party.

List

References

Frederiksberg
Frederiksberg
Lists of political office-holders in Denmark